The Holston Formation, alternately known as the Holston Limestone, is a stratigraphic unit of Ordovician age within the Chickamauga Group in the Ridge-and-Valley physiographic province of the southeastern United States.

The rock that is quarried for marble is a highly pure (97% CaCO3) crystalline limestone, pink to cedar-red in color.

Use in building and sculpture
Among the notable buildings where Tennessee marble is used as a building stone are two in Washington, D.C.: the National Gallery of Art, which uses stone from Knox and Blount counties, and the United States Capitol, which has stairways constructed from Hawkins County marble.

References

General
Mineral Commodities, in Mineral Resources of the Appalachian Region, U.S. Geological Survey and U.S. Bureau of Mines, Geological Survey Professional Paper 580, 1968.

Notes

External links
 Knoxville's marble past, Knoxville News Sentinel, August 26, 2008 (article and videos)

Ordovician geology of Tennessee
Ordovician southern paleotemperate deposits